Cristaria plicata, the cockscomb pearl mussel, is a freshwater mussel, an aquatic bivalve mollusk in the family Unionidae.

Distribution
This species is native to northeast Asia and now also present in parts of southeast Asia. This large mussel is listed as endangered in South Korea.

Biology
The mitochondrial genome of this species was sequenced in 2011 or 2012.

Human uses
In China, this species is significant as "one of the most important freshwater mussels for pearl production in the country."  It is used for medicinal purposes.

References

 Bogan, A. (2013). "FADA Bivalvia: World checklist of Freshwater Bivalvia Species" (version Jan 2013). In: Species 2000 & ITIS Catalogue of Life, 11 March 2013 (Roskov, Y.et al., eds). Online:  www.catalogueoflife.org/col/. Species 2000: Reading, UK.

Unionidae
Bivalves and humans